Kelsey Stewart (born August 15, 1994) is an American softball player. She won two softball National Championships with Florida Gators softball and has been named a Second Team and two-time First Team All-SEC player, including being named 2015 SEC Player of the Year. She was also chosen a National Fastpitch Coaches Association First Team All-American in 2014-15. She graduated as a member of the select 300 hits, 200 runs, 100 stolen bases club. She has been of the United States women's national softball team since 2014. She was a member of the national softball team that won the silver medal at the 2020 Summer Olympics. She later played in the Athletes Unlimited Softball and in 2021 was the third best individual points leader for the league.

Early life
Stewart grew up in Wichita, Kansas. She graduated from Maize High School in 2012.

Career
Stewart played college softball at Florida. During her senior year in 2016, she was one of two active players in the country with 300-plus hits, 200-plus runs and 100-plus stolen bases. She is Florida's all-time leader in hits runs scored (259), total bases (509), hits (357), triples (29), stolen bases (113), batting average (.393) and on-base percentage (.458).

National team
Stewart represented the United States women's national softball team at the 2020 Summer Olympics. During the tournament she had two hits, including the only home run for Team USA. Stewart and Team USA lost in the gold medal game to Team Japan.

Statistics

References

External links
 Florida player profile
 

1994 births
Living people
Florida Gators softball players
Softball players from Kansas
Olympic softball players of the United States
Softball players at the 2020 Summer Olympics
Sportspeople from Wichita, Kansas
Pan American Games medalists in softball
Pan American Games gold medalists for the United States
Softball players at the 2019 Pan American Games
Medalists at the 2019 Pan American Games
Softball players at the 2015 Pan American Games
Medalists at the 2020 Summer Olympics
Olympic silver medalists for the United States in softball
Olympic medalists in softball